Katwijk, also spelled Katwyk, is a coastal municipality and town in the province of South Holland, which is situated in the mid-western part of the Netherlands.

The Oude Rijn ("Old Rhine") river flows through the town and into the North Sea.
 
Katwijk is located on the North Sea, northwest of Leiden and 16 km north of The Hague. It shares its borders with the municipalities of Noordwijk, Teylingen, Oegstgeest, Leiden, and Wassenaar.

Katwijk is by far the largest town in the Duin- en Bollenstreek ("Dune and Bulb Region").

Districts
The town consists of a number of districts, including namesakes Katwijk aan den Rijn and Katwijk aan Zee. On 1 January 2005 the various districts had the following populations:

Katwijk aan den Rijn (5,916)
Katwijk aan Zee (22,405)
Katwijk-Noord (13,845)
Rijnsburg (15,450)
Valkenburg (3,904)

Lying on the coast, Katwijk aan Zee is (and has always been) the larger town. Katwijk aan den Rijn lies just slightly inland. Rijnsburg is situated east of Katwijk aan den Rijn whereas Valkenburg finds itself to the south. Katwijk-Noord is situated north of Katwijk aan Zee.

Although consisting of historically separate towns (except Katwijk-Noord) that still today maintain separate identities, the towns have more or less grown together and merged into a single conurbation. The creation of the municipality of Katwijk is a recognition of that fact. The town hall of the current municipality of Katwijk is located in Katwijk aan den Rijn, near the boundary of Katwijk aan Zee. All these districts lie along the Oude Rijn.

History

The name "Katwijk" probably has its origins in the name of a Germanic tribe called the Chatten (Chatti). The Dutch word "wijk" means "area", so the name probably meant something like "the Chatti area".

In Romans times, Katwijk was a place of strategic importance. It was located at the Roman Empire's northern border, at the mouth of the Rhine river, which in Roman times was larger in this area than it is today. There was a good deal of traffic along the Rhine. Katwijk was also a jumping-off point for the voyage to Britain.

Built during the reign of Emperor Claudius (41-54), the town's name was Lugdunum Batavorum.  The town's name was later associated with the name of the city of Leiden, but this is now thought to be incorrect.

In 1231, the first reference to Catwijck appeared in records.

The history of the modern municipality of Katwijk is essentially the history of its constituent parts, which for each village extends back to Roman times. However, Katwijk aan Zee, Katwijk aan den Rijn and Valkenburg were part of the same heerlijkheid called "Beide de Katwijken en 't Zand" (or something similar). They have been administratively joined for centuries despite their differing characters. Katwijk aan Zee was a fishing town and Katwijk aan den Rijn had an agricultural character.

During World War II, Katwijk aan Zee was heavily damaged. On 1 May 1942 beach access was no longer permitted and large scale evacuation took place. From October 1943 houses were demolished as part of the construction of the Atlantic Wall.

On 1 January 2006, Rijnsburg and Valkenburg were also merged into the municipality, it's called nowadays Katwijk.

Public transportation

Katwijk is a larger town in the Netherlands without a railway station, and the largest without any railway connection. The nearest railway stations are Voorhout and Leiden. Katwijk is connected by bus with Noordwijk, Leiden, The Hague and Lisse. The public transport by bus is served by Arriva.
As of 9 December 2012 new buslines came to Katwijk.

In 2019 and 2020 a lot is changing in Katwijk and Leiden. A quick bus line from Noordwijk to Leiden, with an extra-long bus needs many changes, especially in Katwijk, a two-year plan.

Bus transportation 

 Bus 430/432 - Travels from Noordwijk Estec via the Biltlaan and Zeeweg and N206 to Leiden Centraal. During the day, this bus departs every 15 minutes in every direction.

 Bus 431 - Travels from Katwijk Boulevard-South via Vuurbaak, Boulevard, Tramstraat and Zeeweg to the N206 to Leiden, where it ends at the railway station. During the day, this bus departs every 15 minutes (every 10 minutes during morning rush hour).

 Bus 35 - Local bus service, running from Duinvallei to Unmanned Valley

 Bus 38 - Travels from Katwijk Raadhuis via Kon. Julianalaan and Zanderij through Valkenburg to Leiden Centraal, once an hour.

 Bus 90 - Travels from Lisse, Noordwijkerhout, Noordwijk, Katwijk, Rijnsburg, Oegstgeest to Leiden Centraal, twice an hour. Buses on this route have been converted to allow bicycles to be brought onto the bus. Bus 90 took over the route from bus 37 (Katwijk to Leiden and back)

 Q-liner 385 - Q-liner 385 travels from Sassenheim railway station, via Katwijk to The Hague Central railway station.

Additionally, Rijnsburg and the far northeastern part of Katwijk-Noord are served by bus 20 and 21, running between Noordwijk and Leiden. Peak hour buses connect industrial zones with surrounding municipalities.

Notable people 

 Charley Toorop (1891 in Katwijk –  1955) a Dutch painter and lithographer
 Esther Ouwehand (born 1976 in Katwijk) a politician, parliamentarian for the Party for the Animals

Sport 
 Willem Driebergen (1892 in Katwijk aan Zee – 1965) a Dutch fencer, competed in the individual and team épée events at the 1928 and 1936 Summer Olympics
 Cees de Vreugd, (1952 in Katwijk – 1998) a butcher, strongman and powerlifter
 Jan Siemerink (born 1970 in Rijnsburg) a retired tennis player
 Petra Grimbergen (born 1970 in Rijnsburg) a female road and track racing cyclist, competed at the 1992 Summer Olympics
 Jeffrey Talan (born 1971 in Katwijk) a former professional Dutch international footballer with over 250 club caps
 Marcus van Teijlingen (born 1973 in Rijnsburg) a Dutch dance instructor and professional Latin-American dancer
 Dirk Kuyt (born 1980 in Katwijk) a Dutch former professional footballer with 636 club caps
 Petra Hogewoning (born 1986 in Rijnsburg) a Dutch retired football defender
 Nick Driebergen (born 1987 in Rijnsburg) a Dutch former backstroke swimmer, competed at the 2012 Summer Olympics
 Jaap van Duijn (born 1990 in Katwijk) a Dutch football striker
 Dirk van Duijvenbode (born 1992 in Katwijk aan Zee) a Dutch Professional Darts Corporation player
 Arno Kamminga (born 1995 in Katwijk) a Dutch breaststroke swimmer, competed at the 2020 Summer Olympics

Popular Culture 
The fictional operator 'Iana' from the game Tom Clancy's Rainbow Six Siege is from Katwijk

Tourist attractions
Katwijk is a seaside resort with a wide sandy beach. Its attractiveness is mainly due to its laid-back atmosphere. The boulevard along the shore is not spoiled by large hotels or apartment blocks and has not given in to an excessive commercialisation. Although most buildings lining the boulevard are tourist apartments and pensions, most are just three floors high (and none more than five) and offer a distinctive 'feel' of the 1950s. Besides the beach, there are a few museums in Katwijk, like the old fisherman's museum Katwijks Museum and the Spinoza-museum. A few kilometers inland is the Valkenburg Lake Steam Train, a narrow-gauge railway museum where a scenic steam locomotive driven train ride can be taken around Lake Valkenburg. Katwijk has many hotels and three camping places, mostly situated in the dunes.

Twin towns

Miscellaneous
Katwijk was the landing point for the TAT-14 international telecommunications cable. 
Just north of the Katwijk-Noord district, European space research center ESTEC is located in the municipality of Noordwijk (although several kilometers from the village of Noordwijk).

Image gallery

References

External links

Official website
History of Katwijk

 
Municipalities of South Holland
Populated places in South Holland
Germania Inferior
Populated coastal places in the Netherlands